Mantophryne is a genus of microhylid frogs. The genus is found in New Guinea, Louisiade Archipelago, and Woodlark Island.

Species
There are five recognized species:

References

 
Microhylidae
Amphibian genera
Taxa named by George Albert Boulenger